Dodgeball: A True Underdog Story is a 2004 sports comedy film written and directed by Rawson Marshall Thurber and starring Vince Vaughn and Ben Stiller. The film follows a group of unlikely misfits who enter a Las Vegas dodgeball tournament in the hopes of winning $50,000 to save their cherished local gym from being taken over by corporate health fitness chain Globo Gym.

Theatrically released by 20th Century Fox on June 18, 2004, the film received generally positive reviews from critics and grossed $168.4 million on a $20 million budget.

Plot 

Peter LaFleur owns Average Joe's, a small, dilapidated gym with low membership and staffing. When he defaults on the gym's mortgage, Peter’s cocky and vindictive business rival White Goodman, who owns Globo Gym across the street, purchases it, planning to foreclose on and demolish Average Joe's to build a new auxiliary parking structure for his members unless Peter can raise $50,000 in 30 days. Goodman attempts to seduce attorney Katherine "Kate" Veatch, who is handling his account; repulsed, she cites conflict of interest (COI) to rebuff his disturbing advances.

Peter, gym employees Dwight Baumgarten and Owen Dittman, and members Steve "Pirate" Cowan, Justin Redman, and Gordon Pibb all band together to raise the required money. After an impromptu car wash suggested by Owen fails, Gordon suggests entering a dodgeball tournament in Las Vegas with a $50,000 prize. After watching a 1950s-era training video obtained by Justin featuring Irish-American dodgeball legend Patches O'Houlihan, the team participates in the local qualifiers. Girl Scout Troop 417 easily defeats them, but are later disqualified due to one member's use of three separate types of anabolic steroids and a low-grade beaver tranquilizer, effectively handing the win to Average Joe's by default.

Having spied on Average Joe's using a hidden camera in a cutout of himself, Goodman forms his own team, the Globo Gym Purple Cobras, surprising Gordon by revealing that his extremely personal friendship with the chancellor allowed him to bypass the mandatory qualification match. After watching their confrontation, Patches, now an elderly man who uses a wheelchair, approaches Peter, volunteering to coach the team. Patches' unusual training regimen involves having them dodge wrenches, oncoming cars, and his constant insults. Kate demonstrates skill at the sport but declines to join the team, citing COI. Goodman arrives at Kate's house uninvited and announces that he misled her bosses about her drinking on the job, thus getting her fired from her law firm and freeing him to date her. Enraged, but now free of COI, she rejects Goodman and  joins the Average Joe's team.

Despite early setbacks, the team manages to advance to the final round of the tournament against Globo Gym. The night before the match, a falling sign in the casino kills Patches. Demoralized, and anxious that the team will lose without Patches's motivation, Peter angrily denounces Steve's pirate behavior, causing Steve's departure. Returning to his room, Peter encounters Goodman, who greedily offers him $100,000 for the deed to Average Joe's, claiming that Peter will inevitably cause its closure. The day of the final round, Justin assists his classmate and love interest Amber in a cheerleading competition after his bully and rival Derek becomes severely injured, leaving Average Joe's short of players. Peter briefly encounters Lance Armstrong, who restores his morale, and rejoins his team, but he and Justin return too late; Average Joe's has already forfeited. After Gordon discovers that a majority of the judges can overturn the forfeiture, the tie-breaking vote from Chuck Norris reinstates the team.

After an intense game, Peter and Goodman square off in a sudden-death match. Inspired by Patches' spirit, Peter blindfolds himself, evades Goodman's throw and strikes him in the face, winning the championship and the prize money. Goodman nullifies the victory, revealing that Peter sold Average Joe's to him the previous night, but Peter explains he used Goodman's $100,000 to bet on Average Joe's victory; with the odds against them at 50 to 1, he collects $5 million. Since Globo Gym is a publicly traded company, as Kate explains, Peter purchases a controlling interest in it, thus regaining Average Joe's, then publicly fires Goodman. Steve returns, now appearing more normal, but revives his pirate persona when Peter reveals their winnings as "buried treasure". Joyce, a friend of Kate's who caught an earlier flight from Guam to witness the final match, arrives and kisses her passionately, shocking Peter, but Kate then reveals her bisexuality and kisses Peter similarly. Kate becomes Peter's girlfriend, Justin and Amber get married with a baby on the way, and Owen begins dating Fran Stalinovskovichdaviddivichski from the Globo Gym team. Later on, Peter opens youth dodgeball classes at a newly renovated Average Joe's, while a disgraced Goodman becomes depressed and morbidly obese, blaming Norris for his plight.

Cast 

Vince Vaughn as Peter "Pete" LaFleur, the very laid-back and casual owner of Average Joe's Gym whose lack of attention leads to its foreclosure
Christine Taylor as Katherine "Kate" Veatch, a very athletic real estate and tax lawyer who is assigned by the bank to sort out the finances at Average Joe's Gym and ends up joining the Average Joe's dodgeball team after losing her job
Ben Stiller as White Goodman, the arrogant and cocky owner of Globo Gym who is trying to buy out Average Joe's so that he can demolish it and build a parking lot and aggressively pursues a relationship with Kate despite her constant rejections
Rip Torn as Patches O'Houlihan, a retired seven-time ADAA dodgeball All-Star who coaches the Average Joe's team
Hank Azaria as young Patches
Justin Long as Justin Redman, a high school student and regular customer at Average Joe's
Stephen Root as Gordon Pibb, a regular customer at Average Joe's
Alan Tudyk as Steve "Pirate" Cowan, a regular customer at Average Joe's who dresses, talks, and acts like a pirate
Joel David Moore as Owen Dittman, an employee at Average Joe's
Chris Williams as Dwight Baumgarten, an employee at Average Joe's
Missi Pyle as Fran Stalinovskovichdaviddivichski, a professional dodgeball player from Romanovia, playing for the Globo Gym team
Jamal Duff as Me'Shell Jones, White Goodman's "Fitness Consigliere" who carries out Goodman's orders
Gary Cole as Cotton McKnight, one of the TV announcers for the dodgeball tournament
Jason Bateman as Pepper Brooks, the color commentator for the dodgeball tournament TV broadcast
Al Kaplon as The Referee 
William Shatner as The Dodgeball Chancellor
Julie Gonzalo as Amber, a cheerleader at Justin's high school on whom he has a crush
Trever O'Brien as Derek, another cheerleader at Justin's high school and Amber's boyfriend
Rusty Joiner as Blade, a member of the Globo Gym dodgeball team
Kevin Porter as Lazer, a member of the Globo Gym dodgeball team
Brandon Molale as Blazer, a member of the Globo Gym dodgeball team
Curtis Armstrong as Mr. Ralph
Scarlett Chorvat as Joyce
Lori Beth Denberg as Martha Johnstone
Cayden Boyd as Timmy, a boy in the dodgeball instructional video
Suzy Nakamura as Gordon's wife
Bob Cicherillo as Rory (uncredited)
Patton Oswalt as video store clerk and narrator of a video that Goodman watches while fondling a piece of pizza (uncredited)

Cameo appearances
Lance Armstrong as himself
Chuck Norris as himself, and member of the ADAA Tournament Committee
David Hasselhoff as himself, and coach of the German team

Production 
When the film was screened to test audiences, the original ending had Average Joe's lose to Globo Gym in the final match. After the ending was viewed negatively by the test audiences, the sudden death match and Average Joe's winning the dodgeball tournament were added alongside White going back to obesity.

Copyright lawsuit 
In 2005, two New York City screenwriters, David Price and Ashoka Thomas, filed suit in federal court against Fox and Thurber, claiming copyright infringement of an unproduced screenplay they had written, Dodgeball: The Movie, by Thurber and Fox. They alleged there were a number of similarities in the plots of the two screenplays, and that Thurber may have had access to their screenplay, which was finished a month before his and submitted to an agent whose assistant he was acquainted with. Lawyers for the defendants dismissed some of the allegations as coincidental. They said that both screenplays were the work of writers who used common formulaic elements. Judge Shira Scheindlin denied the defense motion for summary judgment and ordered a jury trial. The suit was later settled out of court.

Reception

Box office 
In its first week, the film grossed over $29 million, and would go on to a domestic gross of $114.3 million, and a worldwide total of $167.7 million.

Critical response 
  Audiences polled by CinemaScore gave the film an average grade of "B+" on an A+ to F scale.

Slant Magazine dismissed the film as "a less-than-one-joke film", while TV Guide remarked that Ben Stiller "doesn't know when to stop". Other critics, such as The Boston Globe, praised Stiller's satirical take on male virility and praised the chemistry between Vince Vaughn and Christine Taylor. Joe Morgenstern of The Wall Street Journal initially declined to review the film, believing it was not worthy of his time. However, after reviewing the DVD, he changed his view, writing, "Mea culpa, mea culpa. Rawson Marshall Thurber's debut feature, starring Ben Stiller opposite Vince Vaughn, is erratic, imbecilic if not completely idiotic, inconsequential in even the small scheme of things, and thoroughly entertaining". Roger Ebert gave the film a three stars out of four rating in his Chicago Sun-Times review and writes "in a miraculous gift to the audience, 20th Century-Fox does not reveal all of the best gags in its trailer."

Awards 
 2004 ESPY Awards
 Best Sports Movie – Nominated
 2005 BMI Awards
 Best Film Music, Theodore Shapiro – Won
 2005 MTV Movie Awards
 Best Comedic Performance, Ben Stiller – Nominated
 Best On-Screen Team (Vince Vaughn, Christine Taylor, Justin Long, Alan Tudyk, Stephen Root, Joel Moore and Chris Williams) – Nominated
  Best Villain, Ben Stiller – Won
 25th Golden Raspberry Awards
 Worst Actor, Ben Stiller (Also for Anchorman: The Legend of Ron Burgundy, Along Came Polly, Envy, and Starsky & Hutch [all 2004]) – Nominated

Legacy

Possible sequel 
On April 22, 2013, it was announced that 20th Century Fox has started developing a sequel to the film, with Clay Tarver writing the script and Ben Stiller and Vince Vaughn returning to star. However Ben Stiller has since stated that he wasn't aware a Dodgeball sequel was happening. A reunion video featuring the cast was released online in June 2017, announcing a competition to raise funds for the Stiller Foundation.

ESPN8: The Ocho 
On August 8, 2017, ESPN paid homage to its lampooned portrayal in Dodgeball by airing a day-long "ESPN8: The Ocho" marathon on its college sports channel ESPNU. In the spirit of the programming depicted in the film, it consisted of lesser-known and unconventional sports and competitions—including trampoline dodgeball, darts, disc golf, kabaddi, and roller derby. The stunt was reprised the following two years on ESPN2, and also included airings of Dodgeball.

Due to a lack of live sports programming during the COVID-19 pandemic, ESPN announced on March 22, 2020, it would reprise the stunt earlier than scheduled on ESPN2. It did it on May 2, 2020, on ESPN, and then August 8, 2020 on ESPN2, as well as the Big Screen in Fortnite Party Royale. A collection of sports that were featured on ESPN8, as well as the ESPN8 broadcast on these said networks, were available on the ESPN app.

Home video 

The DVD and Blu-ray releases all contain various outtakes and deleted scenes including an alternate ending as well as an infamous "Easter Egg" in the form of a spoof director's commentary.

The directors commentary track starts out in the traditional fashion with the director and co-stars but soon adds in extra characters and descends into a largely unrelated comedy experience. Halfway through a seemingly chaotic recording, it stops and is replaced by the directors' commentary for There's Something About Mary.

See also 
 List of American films of 2004

References

External links 

 

2004 films
2004 comedy films
2000s sports comedy films
20th Century Fox films
American sports comedy films
Dodgeball mass media
2000s English-language films
Films set in the Las Vegas Valley
Films shot in the Las Vegas Valley
Films shot in Los Angeles
Films directed by Rawson Marshall Thurber
Red Hour Productions films
Films about ball games
Films produced by Ben Stiller
Films scored by Theodore Shapiro
American LGBT-related films
2004 LGBT-related films
LGBT-related sports comedy films
Bisexuality-related films
2004 directorial debut films
2000s American films